Karl Pichler (born 2 December 1937) is an Austrian bobsledder. He competed in the four-man event at the 1968 Winter Olympics.

References

External links
 

1937 births
Living people
Austrian male bobsledders
Olympic bobsledders of Austria
Bobsledders at the 1968 Winter Olympics
People from Gargazon
Sportspeople from Südtirol